Saʿd al-Dīn Muḥammad ibn al-Muʾayyad ibn Ḥamuwayh al-Ḥamuwayī al-Juwaynī (1190/99 – 1252/60) was a Persian Ṣūfī shaykh from a prominent Ṣūfī family. He belonged to the order of the Kubrāwiyya. A prolific writer, he is credited with at least 47 works plus poetry. He was a noted mystic and much of his writing is esoteric and numerological.

Born and died in Khorasan, he studied in Damascus, went on a pilgrimage to Mecca and lived for a time in Tabrīz and Mosul. He fled the Mongol invasion of Khwārazm in 1220. By 1242 he had contracted an illness that resulted in the loss of a finger.

Life
Saʿd al-Dīn was born in Baḥrābād. His full name was Muḥammad ibn al-Muʾayyad ibn Abī Bakr ibn Abu ʾl-Ḥasan ibn Muḥammad ibn Ḥamuwayh. A fuller name, complete with honorifics is given in the mashyakha: Saʿd al-Dīn Abu ʾl-Saʿādāt Muḥammad ibn Muʿīn al-Dīn Muʾayyad ibn Jamāl al-Dīn Abū Bakr ʿAbd Allāh Ḥasan ibn ʿAlī ibn Abū ʿAbd Allāh Muḥammad ibn Ḥamuwayh. Saʿd al-Dīn's brother Muʿīn al-Dīn ʿUmar was also a Ṣūfī. He should not be confused with his like-named second cousin, Saʿd al-Dīn ibn Tāj al-Dīn. His family is known as the Awlād al-Shaykh (Banū Ḥamawiya).

In his youth, Saʿd al-Dīn studied at Jabal Qāsiyūn outside Damascus under his father's paternal cousin, Ṣadr al-Dīn Abu ʾl-Ḥasan Muḥammad al-Ḥamuwayī. The source do not agree on what he studied. Jāmī believed it was mysticism, but al-Dhahabī calls Ṣadr al-Dīn a Shāfiʿī jurist.

It is not known when Saʿd al-Dīn became a disciple of Najm al-Dīn Kubrā, but it was before the Mongol invasion of Khwārazm in 1220. He had already completed his ḥajj (pilgrimage) at the time. At the approach of the Mongols, Kubrā ordered all his students to return to their homes. Saʿd al-Dīn's ijāza was issued around this time. Saʿd al-Dīn appears to have returned to his uncle (then in Mosul) shortly before the latter's death in 1220. He eventually returned to Jabal Qāsiyūn, where he taught Ṣadr al-Dīn al-Qūnawī, who relayed Saʿd al-Dīn's works to his step-father Ibn al-ʿArabī, who is said to have admired them.

How long Saʿd al-Dīn remained in Jabal Qāsiyūn is unknown, but he eventually moved back to Baḥrābād, where he resided in his family's khānqāh (Ṣūfī school). He made a short trip to Gūrpān to visit with Aḥmad al-Jūrfānī, a student of Rāzī al-Dīn ʿAlī Lālā, a student of Kubrā. He spent nine months in Tabrīz in 1242–1243. According to Ibn al-Karbalāʾī, shortly before his arrival in Tabrīz, he developed a disease which caused him to lose a finger. Possibly this was leprosy. His followers in Tabrīz buried his finger in a local cemetery. According to a legend associated with this stay says that he saw the young Najm al-Dīn Zarkub Tabrīzī playing with other children in the street, placed his hand on his head and predicted his future greatness. Saʿd al-Dīn's son Ṣadr al-Dīn Ibrāhīm was born in Amol in Tabaristan in 644 (1247).

Jāmī records two anecdotes of Saʿd al-Dīn entering into trances. In one, after sitting with his eyes closed for a long time, he called Ṣadr al-Dīn al-Qūnawī to him, opened his eyes and told him, "I wished that the first face my eyes looked upon after they had been honored by a vision of [the Prophet's] beauty should be yours." In the other, he spirit left his body and he lay still for thirteen days. People believed he had died, and when he came to he was unaware how long he had been gone. Ibn al-Karbalāʾī in his Rawḍāt al-jinān (1567) records instances of Saʿd al-Dīn predicting the future.

Saʿd al-Dīn died in Khorasan. The cause of his death is unknown; possibly it was related to the disease he had contracted almost two decades earlier.

Works
Saʿd al-Dīn wrote in both Arabic and Persian. There are at least 29 extant prose works attributed to him, plus another 18 attributed that are possibly lost. His prose works range from short treatises to lengthy books. He also wrote poetry. His works can be roughly divided between those that are esoteric, which often contain ʿilm al-ḥurūf (letter and number mysticism), and those that are exhortative in a typically Kubrawī style. The latter include commentaries on the Qurʾān and the Ḥadīth.

There are 23 titled works that survive in manuscript copies. There are six further works that survive in copies but untitled. There are 18 works cited by title, but not known to survive. They include a work on the New Testament.

Works in Persian
Questions and Answers
On the Particulars of Sūra Yāsīn
On the Complete Actualization of Prayer
On the Science of Letters and Symbol
The Subtleties of Unity in the Wonders of Solitary Devotion
Treatise of the Lamp
Commentary on the Tradition "I Was a Hidden Treasure"
Commentary on Ten Traditions
On Mystical Explanations
On the Recollection of Gabriel
Commentary on the Basmala

Works in Arabic
The Ocean of Meanings
On the Removal of the Curtain and Lifting of the Veil
Book of the Beloved
Book of the Point
Mirror of the Spirits and Signs on the Tablets
On Mystical Journeying and Flight
On the Science of Absolute Realities
On the Appearance of the Seal of Saints
The Seven Paths
Keys to the Secrets
The Nature of Letters and Symbols
On the Meaning of the Letters of the Alphabet

Lost works
The Cause of Separation of the Exile
The Book of the Eye and Vision
Treatise on the Knot and Untying
On the Reality of Time and Hour
On the Letter of the Ascension
On the Equanimity of the Compassionate
Words from the New Testament
The Stages of Burning
The Revelatory Encounter
The Trigonometry of the King and Kingdom
The Covering of Letters and Words
Exploration of the Meaning of Unveiling
The Purification of the Prophet, Upon Him be Peace
The Book of Support and Victory
Manufactured Traditions in the Collected Recension
Heart of the Hereafter
The Vessel of the Virtuous on the Sea of Secrets
Peace for the Pious in Comprehending the Conditions of Certitude

Notes

References

Bibliography

1190s births
1250s deaths
People from Razavi Khorasan Province
13th-century Arabic writers
13th-century Iranian people
14th-century Iranian people
13th-century Persian-language poets
13th-century Persian-language writers
Iranian Sufis
Sufi mystics
Sufi writers
Sufi poets